In magnetics, the maximum energy product is an important figure-of-merit for the strength of a permanent magnet material.

During the 20th century, the maximum energy product of commercially available magnetic materials rose from around 1 MGOe (e.g. in KS Steel) to over 50 MGOe (in neodymium magnets). Other important permanent magnet properties include the remanence and coercivity; these quantities are also determined from the saturation loop and are related to the maximum energy product, though not directly.

Definition and significance

Equivalently, it can be graphically defined as the area of the largest rectangle that can be drawn between the origin and the saturation demagnetization B-H curve (see figure).

This is illustrated by considering a simple magnetic circuit containing a permanent magnet of volume  and an air gap of volume , connected to each other by a magnetic core. Suppose the goal is to reach a certain field strength  in the gap. In such a situation, the total magnetic energy in the gap (volume-integrated magnetic energy density) is directly equal to half the volume-integrated  in the magnet:

thus in order to achieve the desired magnetic field in the gap, the required volume of magnet can be minimized by maximizing  in the magnet.

See also 
 Tetrataenite

References

Magnetostatics
Magnetism
Magnetic ordering